Ednita is the seventh studio album by the Puerto Rican singer,  Ednita Nazario. It was released in 1982.

Track listing
 "A Que No Le Cuentas"
 "Así Eres Tú"
 "Antes Del Amor"
 "Cuando Tu Te Vayas"
 "Yo Soy La Mujer"
 "Por Todo Lo Que Perdimos"
 "Así Era El"
 "Amándote"
 "Me Quedo Aquí Abajo"
 "Por Un Amor (Mírame)"

Singles
 "A Que No Le Cuentas"
 "Me Quedo Aquí Abajo"
 "Yo Soy La Mujer"
 "Antes Del Amor"

Personnel
 Produced by Laureano Brizuela

References

Ednita Nazario albums
1982 albums